Ilham Mammadhasan oglu Rahimov (born on January 14, 1951, Azerbaijan Republic) is an Azerbaijani jurist, Doctor of science of Laws, Professor.

Biography

Ilham Mammadhasan oglu Rahimov was born on January 14, 1951. He studied at the Leningrad State University in 1970–1975 years. He was a post-graduate student in the department of criminal law in Leningrad State University in 1975–1978 years. He has awarded a PhD of law in 1978. His scientific adviser has been Nikolai Alexandrovich Belyayev (1923–2004) who was Honored Scientist of the Russian Federation, Doctor of Law, Professor of Criminal Law of Faculty of Law of St. Petersburg State University and Chairman of the General Council of the Ministry of Education of The Russian Federation.

Leningrad State University in 1988 and defended his doctoral thesis. Thus, he became the youngest doctor in the field of criminal law in the former Soviet Union, and in 1996 became a professor.

Ilham Rahimov has defended his doctoral thesis in Leningrad State University in 1988 years. Thus, he has become the youngest doctor in the field of criminal law in the former Soviet Union. And he has become a professor in 1996.

Scientific activity

He has started his professional career as a junior researcher at the Institute of Philosophy and Law of the National Academy of Sciences of Azerbaijan. He has worked as chief department of the Ministry of Justice of Azerbaijan for a long time. He was head of the Department of Legislation of Ministry of Justice of Azerbaijan. He was a member of the Law Board in 1982–1992 years. At that time, it has developed some regulations and legislation results by Ilham Rahimov. He was director of Institute of Judicial Expertise, Criminal Law and Criminology in 1992–1996 years. He was lecture about law in different high schools; also he has worked as vice-rector for scientific in the Higher Diplomatic College (at present time University of Eurasia) in 1996–2000 years.

He is author a hundred scientific articles about on labor law reform and many monographs that all these scientific works dedicated to the fundamental problems of the judiciary and the legislature.

It occupies an important place in his scientifically career these works "Theoretical and practical problems of the effect of the Penitentiary" (Baku, 1981), "The theory of forecasting" (Baku, 1987), "The philosophy of punishment and its mission problems" (Baku, 1998), "Crime and Punishment" (Moscow, 2012), "Philosophy of Crime and punishment" (S.-Petersburg, 2013).

I.M. Rahimov's book Philosophy of Crime and Punishment has been published in Azeri in 2014 years (editor: Sakit Huseynov, translators: Aydin Alizadeh, Elsevar Samedov).

He has been the first author of the concept of judicial reform was developed in 1992-1993. In 1994, it has prepared the state program for the fight against crime.

It has been elected member of The Academy Russian Security, Defense and Rule of Law on April 18, 2004. İlham Rahimov was second Azerbaijani academician who is awarded by this Academy.

Awards and honors

 Ilham Rahimov was awarded the 2nd degree Order of Peter the Great according to works making friendly relations and cooperation between Azerbaijan and Russia in 2005 years.  He was the first Azerbaijani awarded with the order.
 He was elected honor member of the Board of Directors of the Black Sea and the Caspian Sea Cooperation of the International Fund in 27 August 2009 years. He was conferred with diplomas and medals for his contribution to development of society and convergence of nations and religions by the International Fund. It has been given first diploma of The Found to Azerbaijani scholar, Professor I. Rahimov.
 It has been conferred I. Rahimov with title "Honored lawyer of Azerbaijan Republic"  by the decision of the President of Republic of Azerbaijan in 2011.
 I. Rahimov was awarded with the order first degree (higher) "Crescent and Star" of "International Committee for Protection of Human Rights" and also, it was given to him honorary title of Commander of the Order of the "Crescent and Star" in France, 2011.
 Professor Ilham Rahimov was conferred the winner of the Albert Einstein International Fund in New-York in February, 2014.
 I.Rahimov was awarded for "Cooperation and Partnership contribution to the development of the Black Sea and the Caspian Sea International Fund" Mart 9, 2014 in Istanbul.
 It has been presented the highest award to I.Rahimov honorary award of  "Doctor Honoris Causa" (Honorary degree) of Bulgarian Academy of Sciences of the Republic of Bulgaria, November 12, 2014 in Sofia.
In 2015, Ilham Rahimov was awarded the highest legal award "Themis" for their contribution to the creation of a democratic society and development of rule-of-law state's institutions.

Selected publications

 "The theory of prediction" (Baku, 1987)
It has been attempted to prove scientific facts of possibility of achievement using mathematical and statistical tools of prediction in this book "The prediction theory". It has been investigated extensively problems of creation and development of theoretical and methodological basis of individual criminal prediction problems.

 "Crime and cybernetics" (Baku, 1995)
This book is written by I.Rahimov jointly with E.H.Hasanov, Y.S. Abdullayev and I.A.Cavadov which is dedicated to actual problems of the establishment of comprehensive programs of crime prevention.

 "Criminological analysis of violent and seduction crimes " (Baku, 1997)
It was written on the basis of various kinds of crimes which have occurred in 1987–1993 years. This book was written by I.Rahimov with jointly Y.S. Abdullayev, I.A.Cavadov, S.V. Fomina and M.R. Kazimov.

 "The philosophy of punishment and its mission problems"  (Baku, 1998)
In this book is investigated law of crime, its understanding and essences. It was analyzed the objective capabilities, goals and effectiveness. And it was carried out to determine the importance of ethical categories and analyzed many subjective factors that affect the determination of the punishment.

 "The philosophy of punishment and determination of its amendment " (Baku, 1999, in English)
It was investigated the essence of the crime, sphere of influence and the potential direction of its objective in this book. It has been analyzed general principles for the solution of the crime, ethical categories and subjective factors that influence the way to solve crime. It was indicated regulatory tools of ways solution of crime in this book which is called "The philosophy of punishment and determination of its amendment ".

 "Philosophy of Crime and Punishment" (Russia, Moscow, 2012; Turkish, Istanbul, 2014, English 2015)
It has been investigated the nature and reasons of crime, interpreted the essence, forms and types of the punishment, indicated boundaries of justice in determination of punishment and  determined role of state in ensuring the rule of law during its implementation. It is investigated comprehensively historical aspects of definition and meaning of punishment and at the same time analyzed approaches of different schools and experts about this problem in this book.

References

External links
 
 THE IMMORTALITY OF THE DEATH PENALTY</ref>

1951 births
Living people
Soviet jurists
Azerbaijani jurists
Azerbaijani professors